Coldünya is an Azerbaijani rock band based in Baku. The members are Teymur Nadir (vocals), Rovshan Karimov (vocals, guitar), Samir Jafaali (drums) and Aydin Hajiyev (bass guitar).

The band got its name from the English word Cold and the Azerbaijani word Dünya (World). They are one of the better known and most prolific Azerbaijani bands of the late 20th and early 21st centuries.

History
In 1996, Coldünya recorded and released their first album, Nota Bene, and filmed their first video, "Sehrbaz", which was broadcast and promoted by ANS Radio and ANS TV. Their song "Sehrbaz" was broadcast within two weeks in BBC Radio's Top of the Pops show, presented by Mark Goodier, and took 7th place in BBC's foreign hit-list.

Discography

Albums
Oyanish (December 2003) with Alim Qasimov

References

Azerbaijani rock music groups